Basie & Zoot is a 1975 studio album by Count Basie and Zoot Sims.

Track listing 
 "I Never Knew" (Ted Fio Rito, Gus Kahn) – 4:38
 "It's Only a Paper Moon" (Harold Arlen, Yip Harburg, Billy Rose) – 5:33
 "Blues for Nat Cole" (Count Basie, Zoot Sims) – 6:32
 "Captain Bligh" (Basie, Sims) – 6:36
 "Honeysuckle Rose" (Andy Razaf, Fats Waller) – 6:23
 "Hardav" (Basie, Sims) – 4:41
 "Mean to Me" (Fred E. Ahlert, Roy Turk) – 6:30
 "I Surrender, Dear" (Harry Barris, Gordon Clifford) – 6:05

Personnel 
 Count Basie - piano & organ
 Zoot Sims - tenor saxophone
 John Heard - double bass
 Louie Bellson - drums

References 

1975 albums
Count Basie albums
Zoot Sims albums
Pablo Records albums
Albums produced by Norman Granz